Articles with hAudio microformats

"Think About Things" is a song by Icelandic singer Daði Freyr and his band . The song was released on 10 January 2020 with the Icelandic title "", the name of the band. It was selected to represent Iceland in the Eurovision Song Contest 2020 in Rotterdam, the Netherlands on 29 February 2020. The band planned to compete in Eurovision with the English version of their song. Prior to the cancellation of the contest, the song was considered one of the favourites to win. The song became a viral hit, receiving acclaim by multiple international celebrities.

Background and composition 
The song has two different-language versions – one in Icelandic ("Gagnamagnið"; released 10 January 2020) and one in English ("Think About Things"). The meanings of the two versions' lyrics differ. In an interview, Daði stated that the Icelandic version's lyrics "talk about Gagnamagnið (the fictional band we perform as in Söngvakeppnin) coming from the future and outer space to save the world with their brand new dance".

The band competed in Eurovision with the English version of their song. Daði has stated that he considers the English-language lyrics to be "the real version of the song". Daði has described how the English lyrics of the song are about his infant daughter:

Music video and promotion
The music video of the English version of the song was released on 14 February 2020. Daði has stated that the "nerdy aesthetic" of Gagnamagnið originated from the fake instruments made from computer parts, which were in turn inspired by The Brett Domino Trio. The dancing during the chorus was inspired by the video for Skibidi by Russian rave band Little Big, who were also set to compete in that year's Eurovision with their song Uno.

After Daði's Söngvakeppnin victory, many people uploaded clips on social media in which they danced to the song. This phenomenon started after a 'quarantine video' featuring the song, posted on Twitter, went viral, earning 348,200 likes and 7.9 million views (as of 10 June 2020). The song received critical acclaim of several international celebrities, and some of them, including Jennifer Garner and San Antonio Spurs mascot Coyote, uploaded their own dance videos to the song on social media platforms. On the day prior to the broadcast of Eurovision: Europe Shine a Light, a replacement show for the cancelled Eurovision Song Contest, Daði uploaded a fan video of Think About Things, featuring many of those clips, on YouTube. During Europe Shine A Light, he told that the response to his song was "overwhelming".

Eurovision Song Contest

The song was scheduled to represent Iceland in the Eurovision Song Contest 2020, after Daði & Gagnamagnið was selected through Söngvakeppnin 2020, the music competition that selects Iceland's entries for the Eurovision Song Contest. On 28 January 2020, a special allocation draw was held which placed each country into one of the two semi-finals, as well as which half of the show they would perform in. Iceland was placed into the second semi-final, to be held on 14 May 2020, and was scheduled to perform in the first half of the show.

Charts 
The song reached number 34 on the UK Singles Chart, making it the first Eurovision entry to reach the Top 40 in UK since "Heroes" by Måns Zelmerlöw in 2015.

Weekly charts

Year-end charts

Certifications

References

2020 singles
2020 songs
Eurovision songs of 2020
Eurovision songs of Iceland
Number-one singles in Iceland
Songs about children
Songs about parenthood